Borholla College, established in 1990, is a general degree college situated at Borholla, in Jorhat district, Assam. This college is affiliated with the Dibrugarh University. This college offers bachelor's degree courses in arts.

References

Universities and colleges in Assam
Colleges affiliated to Dibrugarh University
Educational institutions established in 1990
1990 establishments in Assam